Henry Bentinck, 1st Duke of Portland (17 March 1682 – 4 July 1726), of Titchfield, Hampshire, styled Viscount Woodstock from 1689 until 1709, was a British Whig politician who sat in the English and British House of Commons from 1705 until 1709 when he succeeded to the peerage as Earl of Portland. He was Governor of Jamaica from 1721 to 1726.

Early life
Bentinck was the second, but eldest surviving, son of William Bentinck, 1st Earl of Portland, and his wife Anne née Villiers. His mother was from the Villiers family, the eldest daughter of Sir Edward Villiers and sister of Edward Villiers, 1st Earl of Jersey.
From 1702 to 1703, Bentinck did the Grand Tour around Europe, travelling through Italy and Germany with his tutor, the historian Paul de Rapin. On 9 June 1704, he married Lady Elizabeth Noel, daughter of Wriothesley Baptist Noel, 2nd Earl of Gainsborough and Catherine Greville at Chiswick, an heiress with a fortune of £60,000, who brought him the estate of Titchfield in Hampshire.

Career

At the 1705 English general election, Bentinck was returned in a contest as Whig Member of Parliament for Southampton. Apart from carrying out minor functions, he appears to have been inactive in Parliament. At the 1708 British general election, he was returned unopposed for Southampton and in a contest at Hampshire, and opted to sit for Hampshire. He acted as a teller for the Whigs. He succeeded his father as Earl of Portland on 23 November 1709 and vacated his seat in the House of Commons to sit in the Lords. He now owned the principal family seat of Bulstrode in Berkshire, and also inherited estates worth about £850,150 in Cheshire, Cumberland, Hertfordshire, Norfolk, Sussex, Westminster and Yorkshire, In 1710, he was appointed Colonel of the 1st Troop of Horse Guards until 1713. He was created Marquess of Titchfield and Duke of Portland on 6 July 1716. In 1719 he was one of main subscribers in the Royal Academy of Music (1719), a corporation that produced baroque opera on stage. He was appointed Lord of the Bedchamber in 1717 and held the post for the rest of hislife.

Portland lost a huge amount of money in the South Sea Bubble in 1720. In 1721, he accepted the post of Governor of Jamaica, which was a lucrative but not a very prestigious post, and one with a low survival rate.

Death and legacy
Portland died in Jamaica at Spanish Town on 4 July 1726, aged 45, and his body was returned to England for burial. He was interred on 3 November 1796 in Westminster Abbey in the vault of the Dukes of Ormond located in the King Henry VII Chapel. Portland and his wife had three sons and seven daughters, who included
William Bentinck, Viscount Woodstock, later Marquess of Titchfield, later 2nd Duke of Portland (1709–1762)
Lord George (1715–1759), soldier
Lady Anne (d. 1749), married Col. Daniel Paul
Lady Amelia Catharina (d. 1756), married Jacob van Wassenaer, Heer van Hazerswoude-Waddingsveen
Lady Isabella (d. 1783), married Henry Monck, uncle of Charles Monck, 1st Viscount Monck; their daughter Elizabeth married the 1st Marquess of Waterford.

References

External links
Biography of the 1st Duke, with links to online catalogues, from Manuscripts and Special Collections, The University of Nottingham

1682 births
1726 deaths
British Life Guards officers
British MPs 1707–1708
British MPs 1708–1710
101
Governors of Jamaica
H
Burials at Westminster Abbey
Members of the Parliament of Great Britain for English constituencies
English MPs 1705–1707